Wojnowo  is a village in the administrative district of Gmina Murowana Goślina, within Poznań County, Greater Poland Voivodeship, in west-central Poland. In 2004 it had a population of 387. It was first mentioned in written records in 1325.

Wojnowo is situated close to Lake Wojnowskie, between Długa Goślina and Łopuchowo. It has a palace, built in 1836 in neo-Renaissance style, set in 5 hectares of grounds (in private ownership). There is also a chapel, and a mile-long avenue of lime trees (along the road to Łopuchowo). A collective farm operated during the communist era, but many of its buildings are now in disrepair. There was also formerly a distillery in the village.

About 2 km to the north-east lies the village of Wojnówko, which consists largely of a complex of vacation properties on the banks of Lake Łomno.

Notes

References
Murowana Goślina i okolice, N. Kulse, Z. Wojczak (local publication)

Wojnowo